Francis Macdonald Cornford  (27 February 1874 – 3 January 1943) was an English classical scholar and translator known for work on ancient philosophy, notably Plato, Parmenides, Thucydides, and ancient Greek religion. Frances Cornford, his wife, was a noted poet. Due to the similarity in their names, he was known in the family as "FMC" and his wife as "FCC".

Early life and family
Cornford was born in Eastbourne, Sussex, on 27 February 1874. He attended St Paul's School, London.

In 1909 Cornford married the poet Frances Darwin, daughter of Sir Francis Darwin and Ellen Wordsworth Darwin, née Crofts, and a granddaughter of Charles Darwin. They had five children:
Helena (1913–1994), who married Joseph L. Henderson in 1934 
John (1915–1936), poet and Communist killed in the Spanish Civil War
Christopher (1917–1993), artist and writer, the father of Adam Cornford
Hugh Wordsworth (1921–1997), medical doctor
Ruth Clare (1923–1992), mother of Matthew Chapman

Academic career
Cornford was educated at Trinity College, Cambridge, where he was a Fellow from 1899 and held a teaching post from 1902. He became the first Laurence Professor of Ancient Philosophy in 1931 and was elected a Fellow of the British Academy in 1937. He used wit and satire to propagate proposals for reforming the teaching of the classics at Cambridge, in Microcosmographia Academica (1908).

Cornford coined the phrase "twin pillars of Platonism", referring to the theory of Forms on the one hand, and, on the other the doctrine of immortality of the soul.

He died on 3 January 1943 in his home, Conduit Head in Cambridge. He was cremated at Cambridge Crematorium on 6 January 1943.

Works
Thucydides Mythistoricus (1907) put the argument that Thucydides's History of the Peloponnesian War was informed by Thucydides's tragic view.
From Religion to Philosophy: A Study in the Origins of Western Speculation (1912) sought the deep religious and social concepts that informed the early Greek philosophers. He returned to this in Principium Sapientiae: The Origins of Greek Philosophical Thought (posthumous, 1952).
Microcosmographia Academica (1908) was an insider's satire on academic politics. It was the source of catch phrases such as the "doctrine of unripeness of time", the "principle of the wedge" and the "principle of the dangerous precedent".
Before and After Socrates (1932)
Plato's Cosmology : The Timaeus of Plato. Hackett Publishing Company (1935)
According to the preface to The Republic of Plato, translated with an introduction and notes (OUP, 1941), it "aims at conveying... as much as possible of the thought of the Republic in the most convenient and least misleading form."

See also

Jane Ellen Harrison
Conduit Head
Esther Salaman

References

Footnotes

Sources

External links
Microcosmographia Academica online
British Academy Fellowship entry
The Origin of Attic Comedy (1914)
Greek Religious Thought from Homer to the Age of Alexander (1923)
Greek Natural Philosophy and Modern Science a Lecture (1938) 

Trinity College Chapel

1874 births
1943 deaths
20th-century English male writers
20th-century scholars
20th-century British translators
Alumni of Trinity College, Cambridge
British scholars of ancient Greek philosophy
Darwin–Wedgwood family
English classical scholars
English translators
Fellows of the British Academy
Fellows of Trinity College, Cambridge
Members of the University of Cambridge faculty of classics
People educated at St Paul's School, London
People from Eastbourne
Laurence Professors of Ancient Philosophy